The 1993–94 Czech First League was the first season of top-tier football in the Czech Republic following the dissolution of Czechoslovakia on 1 January 1993. The season started on 14 August 1993 and ended on 8 June 1994.

Changes from 1992–93

Promoted from the Českomoravská fotbalová liga
 Drnovice
 Slovan Liberec
 Svit Zlín
 Union Cheb
 Viktoria Plzeň
 Viktoria Žižkov

Left for the Slovak Super Liga after the Dissolution of Czechoslovakia
 DAC Dunajská Streda
 Inter Bratislava
 Nitra
 Slovan Bratislava
 Spartak Trnava
 Tatran Prešov

Stadia and locations

League table

Results

Top goalscorers

See also
 1993–94 Czech Cup
 1993–94 Czech 2. Liga

References

  ČMFS statistics

Czech First League seasons
Czech
1993–94 in Czech football